The Cray XT3 is a distributed memory massively parallel MIMD supercomputer designed by Cray Inc. with Sandia National Laboratories under the codename Red Storm. Cray turned the design into a commercial product in 2004. The XT3 derives much of its architecture from the previous Cray T3E system, and also from the Intel ASCI Red supercomputer.

XT3
The XT3 consists of between 192 and 32,768 processing elements (PEs), where each PE comprises a 2.4 or 2.6 GHz AMD Opteron processor with up to two cores, a custom "SeaStar" communications chip, and between 1 and 8 GB of RAM. The PowerPC 440 based SeaStar device provides a 6.4 gigabyte per second connection to the processor across HyperTransport, as well as six 8-gigabyte per second links to neighboring PEs. The PEs are arranged in a 3-dimensional torus topology, with 96 PEs in each cabinet. 

The XT3 runs an operating system called UNICOS/lc that partitions the machine into three sections, the largest comprising the Compute nodes, and two smaller sections for Service nodes and IO nodes.  In UNICOS/lc 1.x, the Compute PEs run a Sandia developed microkernel called Catamount, which is descended from the SUNMOS OS of the Intel Paragon; in UNICOS/lc 2.0, Catamount was replaced by a specially tuned version of Linux called Compute Node Linux (CNL). Service and IO PEs run the full version of SuSE Linux and are used for interactive logins, systems management, application compiling and job launch. I/O PEs use physically distinct hardware, in that the node boards include PCI-X slots for connections to Ethernet and Fibre Channel networks. 

Though the performance of each XT3 model will vary with the speed and number of processors installed, the November 2007 Top500 results for the Red Storm machine, the largest XT3 machine installed at Sandia, measured 102.7 teraflops on the Linpack benchmark, placing it at #6 on the list.  After upgrades in 2008 to install some XT4 nodes with quad-core Opterons, Red Storm achieved 248 teraflops to place at #9 on the November 2008 Top500.  The architecture was superseded in 2006 by the Cray XT4.

External links 
XT3 at top500.org
 Fireworks with new products at Cray - the XT3, Primeur, November 2004
 Cray XT3 Datasheet

Xt3
X86 supercomputers
Computer-related introductions in 2004